The action of 1570 was a naval battle between forces of Malta, then under the protection of the Order of Saint John, and the Ottoman Empire. The battle took place in July 1570, after four Maltese galleys  encountered an Ottoman fleet under Uluj Ali. Three Maltese galleys were captured by the Ottomans and one fled.

References
 The Maltese Cross: A Strategic History of Malta, Dennis Angelo Castillo, page 82, 2006

Conflicts in 1570
1570
1570
1570 in the Ottoman Empire
1570 in Malta